Andreas Kosmatopoulos (born 26 September 1968) is a Greek yacht racer who competed in the 1992 Summer Olympics, in the 1996 Summer Olympics, in the 2000 Summer Olympics, in the 2004 Summer Olympics, and in the 2008 Summer Olympics.

Personal
Kosmatopoulos is married with Işın Şahinöz.

References

External links
 

1968 births
Living people
Greek male sailors (sport)
Olympic sailors of Greece
Sailors at the 1992 Summer Olympics – 470
Sailors at the 1996 Summer Olympics – 470
Sailors at the 2000 Summer Olympics – 470
Sailors at the 2004 Summer Olympics – 470
Sailors at the 2008 Summer Olympics – 470
Place of birth missing (living people)
470 class world champions
World champions in sailing for Greece